Marko Soldo (born 13 September 1996) is an Austrian professional footballer.

References

Living people
1996 births
Association football goalkeepers
Austrian Football Bundesliga players
Austrian footballers
Wolfsberger AC players